Mansa Jata, commonly referred to as Mari Jata II, possibly incorrectly, was mansa of Mali from 1360 to 1374. He was an ineffective ruler, and his reign, recorded by the contemporary North African historian Ibn Khaldun, marked the beginning of the decline of the Mali Empire.

Jata was the son of Mansa Maghan, and as such the grandson of Mansa Musa. Jata may be the same person as a figure named Jatil mentioned by Ibn Battuta.  If so, he was living in exile in Kanburni during the reign of his great-uncle Mansa Suleyman, possibly because Suleyman had seized the throne from Jata's father Maghan by force. Jata then would have conspired with Suleyman's wife Qasa, who may have been his sister, to depose Suleyman. However, Qasa was found out and the coup attempt was prevented.

When Suleyman died, he was succeeded by his son Qanba, who would reign for only nine months. Civil war soon broke out, of which Jata was the victor. He had consolidated power by late 1360. A delegation bearing gifts for the Marinid sultan had been prepared by Suleyman, but he had died before the delegation could be sent, and the delegation spent the civil war in Walata. Jata added gifts to the delegation, including a giraffe, and sent the delegation to Fez. The delegation arrived in December 1360 or January 1361, where it was received by Sultan Abu Salim and attracted much interest among the people of Fez.

Jata was regarded as a tyrannical and wasteful ruler. He was said to have sold one of the national treasures of Mali, a boulder of gold that weighed twenty qintars, for far less than it was worth.

Jata contracted a sleeping sickness which increasingly incapacitated him. After two years of illness and a fourteen-year reign he died, in 1373 or 1374. He was succeeded by his son Musa; another son of his, Magha, would succeed Musa.

D. T. Niane identified Jata with Konkodugu Kamissa, a figure in oral tradition of Hamana, but Yves Person disputed Niane's interpretations of traditional genealogies and suggested that there is a gap in oral tradition between the middle of the 14th century and beginning of the 17th, with Sulayman being the last mansa remembered before this gap.

Footnotes

References

Works cited

 .
, translated in 

.

 

1374 deaths
Mansas of Mali
People of the Mali Empire
14th-century monarchs in Africa
Year of birth unknown
Keita family